The men's discus throw at the 2010 African Championships in Athletics was held on July 29.

Results

External links
Results

Discus
Discus throw at the African Championships in Athletics